Pine Camp Hospital originally opened as Pine Camp Home for Consumptives, on 28 Nov 1910. It operated as a tuberculosis hospital from 1910 to 1957. The complex is located on Old Brook Road, near Ginter Park in Richmond, Virginia. Over time the original structures were replaced with a two-story Central Building (1932) and a one-story, Bungalow-style Administration Building (1932).  Both buildings are constructed of structural tile covered with plaster.  Also on the property is a contributing one-story, stuccoed masonry laundry and garage building (1922). After 1957 the property was converted for use as a recreation center.

The site was listed on the National Register of Historic Places in 2003.

"Pine Camp Open. New Tuberculosis Home Begins With Eight Patients. Pine Camp Home for Consumptives, on the Brook Road, about a mile beyond Ginter Park, was opened yesterday morning with eight inmates in attendance. Dr. Giles B. Cook, chief physician, and Miss Florence Black, the nurse in charge were there to take charge of the new arrivals, who were immediately made comfortable. There are many other applications for admission into the camp, but until certain details are worked out only who came in yesterday will be taken care of. The Lean-to as the building is called, is designed to accommodate twenty persons and it is expected to be full in a few weeks. Besides taking advance cases of tuberculosis, the camp is designed also to prevent the spread of the disease. Although an effort will be made to cure cases in the early stages, advanced patients also will be taken in.” The Times Dispatch (Richmond, Virginia) 29 Nov 1910, Tuesday Page 9.

References

Hospital buildings completed in 1932
Hospital buildings on the National Register of Historic Places in Virginia
Neoclassical architecture in Virginia
Buildings and structures in Richmond, Virginia
National Register of Historic Places in Richmond, Virginia
Tuberculosis sanatoria in the United States
1932 establishments in Virginia
1957 disestablishments in Virginia